Sidney Harold Tanenbaum (October 8, 1925 – September 4, 1986) was an American professional basketball player. He was twice a consensus first-team All-American (in 1946 and 1947) and twice a Haggerty Award winner (1946 and 1947). He went on to play professionally for the New York Knicks and the Baltimore Bullets.

Early life
Tanenbaum was born in Brooklyn, New York, grew up in its Brownsville neighborhood, and was Jewish. He was an all-scholastic player at Thomas Jefferson High School. He met his wife, Bobbie Wolfson, in college when he was a junior.

Basketball career
A 6' 0" guard/forward, Tanenbaum played college basketball at New York University, where he was captain of the team in 1947, and was a two-time All-American and two-time Haggerty Award winner as the outstanding player in the metropolitan area. He also won the 1947 Bar Kochba Award, which honored him as the best Jewish American athlete in the nation, and was named first team All-Met in all four of his varsity seasons.<ref name=autogenerated2>"Tanenbaum, Sidney Harold", Jewish Virtual Library</ref> Wilbur Wood, the sports editor of the New York Sun, wrote of Tanenbaum in 1947: "He is the finest all-around basketball performer ever to don Violet livery." He left NYU as the school's all-time leading scorer, with 992 points.  NYU annually awards its top student-athlete the Sid Tanenbaum Memorial Award.

Tanenbaum played two seasons (1947–49) in the Basketball Association of America as a member of the New York Knicks and Baltimore Bullets. On February 11, 1949, the New York Knicks traded him to the Baltimore Bullets for Connie Simmons. He scored 633 points in 70 games and tallied 162 assists. He was inducted into the New York City Basketball Hall of Fame, and in 1997 into the International Jewish Sports Hall of Fame.

Personal life
After his basketball career, Tanenbaum lived in Woodmere, New York, with his wife Barbara and sons Steven and Michael (an optometrist). He owned a machine shop specializing in metal spinning and stamping in Far Rockaway, Queens, known as the Able Metal Spinning and Stamping.

Murder
Tanenbaum was murdered on September 4, 1986, aged 60, when he was stabbed to death by a local 37-year-old woman in his shop. Police described Tanenbaum as "something of a benefactor in his neighborhood" who often gave money to people living in the streets. According to reports, he was stabbed because he decided to stop lending money to his attacker after assisting her many times in the past, and when he turned his back she attacked him. His killer, Molly Dotsun, was sentenced to 21 years in prison.

The basketball courts at the park in North Woodmere, New York, are named after Tanenbaum. Since 1986, they have hosted the Sid Tanenbaum Memorial Basketball Tournament that raises scholarship money for students in the Five Towns.

BAA career statistics

Regular season

Playoffs

See also
List of select Jewish basketball players

References

External links
Sid Tannenbaum at Jews in Sports''

1925 births
1986 deaths
All-American college men's basketball players
American men's basketball players
Baltimore Bullets (1944–1954) players
Deaths by stabbing in New York (state)
Jewish American sportspeople
Jewish men's basketball players
Male murder victims
Murdered American Jews
NYU Violets men's basketball players
New York Knicks players
Sportspeople from Brooklyn
Basketball players from New York City
People from Woodmere, New York
Guards (basketball)
20th-century American Jews